Thippiri Tirupathi alias Devuji is an Indian Maoist leader and Central Committee member of the Communist Party of India (Maoist).

Political life
Tirupathi hails from Ambedkar Nagar village in Karimnagar district in the Indian state of Telangena. His father name is Venkat Narsaiah. Tirupathi's name is in the National Investigation Agency's (NIA) most wanted list, with a bounty of Rs. 10 lakh. He is known as Sanjeev, Chetan, Ramesh, Sudharshan, Devanna inside the Party. Tirupathi, being a senior member of Central Military Commission, guides the Central Regional Bureau (CRB) of CPI (Maoist) in military issues. Police believe that Tirupathi is one of the mastermind of April 2010 Maoist attack in Dantewada and killing of 74 jawans of Central Reserve Police Force.

References

Living people
Anti-revisionists
Communist Party of India (Maoist) politicians
Indian guerrillas
Indian Marxists
Naxalite–Maoist insurgency
People from Andhra Pradesh
Year of birth missing (living people)
People from Karimnagar district